New Bedford Public Schools (NBPS) is a school district serving New Bedford, Massachusetts, United States. Its headquarters are the Paul Rodrigues Administration Building.

During the 2006–07 academic year, the New Bedford school district (then under the direction of Superintendent Michael Longo) was one of several in Massachusetts labeled as "underperforming" under the state's MCAS guidelines.  The school system, like that of nearby Fall River, is also in the process of major school upgrades and consolidations, having rebuilt several of its schools in recent years. The most recent, Keith Middle School, required a cleanup of the polluted soil on the site.

The school district, headquartered in the former high school building on County Street, is made up of  twenty-eight schools.

It is one of two districts, along with Fairhaven School District, that takes Acushnet students for secondary school.

History
By 2019 the district received an influx of students speaking the Kʼicheʼ language. In 2019 an advocacy group for the Maya people complained to the courts that the school district was not providing adequate Kʼicheʼ language services. The U.S. Department of Justice and the school district came to resolution so the school district could provide appropriate Kʼicheʼ language services. The Equal Educational Opportunities Act of 1974 requires school districts to provide services to speakers of languages other than English.

Demographics
In 2022, the student count was 13,000; these students spoke 40 languages and originated from 25 countries. Of the total students, 5,000 were classified as having English as a second language. 42% of the total student body had a home language other than English.

Schools
 New Bedford High School
 Middle schools:
Keith
Normandin
Roosevelt

Elementary Schools

 Charles S. Ashley Elementary
 Elizabeth Carter Brooks Elementary
 Elwyn G. Campbell Elementary
 Sgt. William H. Carney Academy
 James B. Congdon Elementary
 John B. DeValles Elementary
 Alfred J. Gomes Elementary
 Ellen R. Hathaway Elementary
 Hayden-McFadden Elementary
 Irwin Jacob Elementary
 Horatio A. Kempton Elementary
 Abraham Lincoln Elementary
 Carlos Pacheco Elementary
 John Avery Parker Elementary
 Casimir Pulaski Elementary
 Thomas R. Rodman Elementary
 Jireh Swift Elementary
 William H. Taylor Elementary
 Betsey B. Winslow Elementary

References

Further reading
  -  Regarding Kiche language services

External links

 New Bedford Public Schools

School districts in Massachusetts
New Bedford, Massachusetts
Education in Bristol County, Massachusetts